SEC Nation is an ESPN entertainment show previewing college football games from the Southeastern Conference. Based on the format of College Gameday, the show previews SEC football games from a SEC school each week.

The show airs from 10 a.m. until 12 p.m. Eastern Time every Saturday on SEC Network. The two-hour pregame show has several established weekly segments, including Y'all, Reese's Picks, and more.

Personalities

Current
Laura Rutledge: (Host, 2017–present; Reporter, 2016)
Paul Finebaum: (Analyst, 2014–2019; 2021–present)
Tim Tebow: (Analyst, 2014–present)
Jordan Rodgers: (Analyst, 2020–present)
Roman Harper: (Analyst, 2020–present)
Marty Smith: (Reporter, 2019–present)
Ryan McGee: (Reporter, 2019–present)

Former
Joe Tessitore: (Host, 2014–2015)
Kaylee Hartung: (Reporter, 2014–2015)
Greg McElroy: (Analyst, 2015)
Maria Taylor: (Host, 2016)
Lauren Sisler: (Reporter, 2017–2018)
Marcus Spears: (Analyst, 2014–2019)

Locations

2014 season

2015 season

2016 season

2017 season
{| class="wikitable" style="text-align:center"
|- style="background:#A32638;"|24
!Date!!colspan=2|Visitor!!colspan=2|Host!!City!!Location!!Notes
|-
||September 2, 2017
|style=""|No. 11 Michigan
|33
|style=""|No. 17 Florida
|17
||Arlington, TX
||Outside AT&T Stadium
||Advocare Classic
|-
||September 9, 2017
|style=""|South Carolina
|31
|style=""|Missouri
|13
||Columbia, MO
||Francis Quadrangle
||
|-
||September 16, 2017
|style=""|No. 12 LSU
|7
|style=""|Mississippi State
|37
||Starkville, MS
||The Junction
||LSU–Mississippi State football rivalry
|-
||September 23, 2017
|style=""|No. 1 Alabama
|59
|style=""|Vanderbilt
|0
||Nashville, TN
||Ingram Commons
||
|-
||September 30, 2017
|style=""|No. 7 Georgia
|41
|style=""|Tennessee
|0
||Knoxville, TN
||Ayres Hall
||Georgia–Tennessee football rivalry
|-
|October 7, 2017
|style=""|LSU
|17
|style=""|No. 21 Florida
|16
||Gainesville, FL
||Plaza of the Americas
||Florida–LSU football rivalry
|-
|October 14, 2017
|style=""|Missouri
|28
|style=""|No. 4 Georgia
|53
||Athens, GA
||Special Collections Library
||
|-
||October 21, 2017
|style=""|Tennessee
|7
|style=""|No. 1 Alabama
|45
||Tuscaloosa, AL
||Outside Moore Hall
||Third Saturday in October
|-
||October 28, 2017
|style=""|No. 3 Georgia
|42
|style=""|Florida
|7
||Jacksonville, FL
||Outside EverBank Field
||Florida–Georgia football rivalry
|-
||November 4, 2017
|style=""|No. 19 LSU
|10
|style=""|No. 1 Alabama
|24
||Tuscaloosa, AL
||Outside Moore Hall
||Alabama–LSU football rivalry
|-
||November 11, 2017
|style=""|No. 2 Georgia
|17
|style=""|No. 10 Auburn
|40
||Auburn, AL
||Wellness Kitchen Green Space
||Deep South's Oldest Rivalry
|-
||November 18, 2017
|style=""|Kentucky
|13
|style=""|No. 7 Georgia
|42
||Athens, GA
||Myers Quad
||
|-
||November 25, 2017
|style=""|No. 4 Clemson
|34
|style=""|South Carolina
|10
||Columbia, SC
||Gamecock Park
||Palmetto Bowl
|-
||December 2, 2017
|style=""|No. 6 Georgia
|28
|style=""|No. 4 Auburn
|7
||Atlanta, GA
||Georgia World Congress Center
||SEC Championship Game (rivalry)
|-
||January 1, 2018
|style=""|No. 4 Alabama
|24
|style=""|No. 1 Clemson
|6||New Orleans, LA
||Outside Mercedes-Benz Superdome
||Sugar Bowl (CFP Semi-final) (rivalry)
|-
||January 8, 2018
|style=""|No. 4 Alabama
|26OT
|style=""|No. 3 Georgia|23||Atlanta, GA
||Georgia World Congress Center
||CFP National Championship Game (rivalry)
|}

2018 season

2019 season

2021 season

2022 season

Winners are listed in bold.
Home team listed in italics'' for neutral-site or off-campus games.
All rankings displayed for FBS teams are from the AP Poll at the time of the game.

Appearances and results by school

SEC

Non-SEC

Other conference records

Off campus locations

Regular season

 Nissan Stadium (previously LP Field), Nashville, TN
 2014 home game for Vanderbilt vs. No. 15 Ole Miss
 TIAA Bank Field (previously Everbank Field), Jacksonville, FL
 2016 Florida–Georgia football rivalry game
 2017 Florida–Georgia football rivalry game
 2018 Florida–Georgia football rivalry game
 2019 Florida–Georgia football rivalry game
 2021 Florida–Georgia football rivalry game
 2022 Florida–Georgia football rivalry game
 AT&T Stadium, Arlington, Texas
 2017 Advocare Classic: No. 17 Florida vs. No. 11 Michigan
 2022 Arkansas–Texas A&M football rivalry game
 Bank of America Stadium, Charlotte, North Carolina
 2018 Belk Kickoff Game; No. 17 West Virginia vs. Tennessee
 Camping World Stadium, Orlando, Florida
 2019 Camping World Kickoff; Miami (FL) vs. No. 8 Florida
 Mercedes Benz Stadium, Atlanta, Georgia
 2021 Chick-fil-A Kickoff Game; No. 1 Alabama vs. No. 14 Miami

Post-season
 Georgia Dome, Georgia World Congress Center, Atlanta, GA
 2014 SEC Championship Game
 2015 SEC Championship Game
 2016 SEC Championship Game
 2016 Peach Bowl – CFP Semi-final Game 
 Mercedes-Benz Superdome, New Orleans, LA
 2015 Sugar Bowl – CFP Semi-final Game 
 2018 Sugar Bowl – CFP Semi-final Game 
 2020 CFP National Championship Game
 AT&T Stadium, Arlington, Texas
 2015 Cotton Bowl Classic – CFP Semi-final Game 
 2021 Cotton Bowl Classic – CFP Semi-final Game
 University of Phoenix Stadium, Glendale, Arizona
 2016 CFP National Championship Game
 Raymond James Stadium, Tampa, Florida
 2017 CFP National Championship Game
 Mercedes-Benz Stadium, Georgia World Congress Center, Atlanta, GA
 2017 SEC Championship Game
 2018 CFP National Championship Game
 2018 SEC Championship Game
 2019 SEC Championship Game
 2019 Peach Bowl – CFP Semi-final Game
 2021 SEC Championship Game
 2022 Peach Bowl – CFP Semi-final Game
 Hard Rock Stadium, Miami, Florida
 2018 Orange Bowl – CFP Semi-final Game 
 Levi's Stadium, Santa Clara, California
 2019 CFP National Championship Game
 Camping World Stadium, Orlando, Florida
 2019 VRBO Citrus Bowl
 2020 VRBO Citrus Bowl
 Lucas Oil Stadium, Indianapolis, Indiana
 2022 CFP National Championship Game
 Sofi Stadium, Inglewood, California
 2023 CFP National Championship Game

Tebow's Freak of the Week

2014

2015

2016

October 8: There was no Freak of the Week due to SEC Nation not being at a specific location because of Hurricane Matthew moving SEC Nation to their Charlotte studios. The Freak of the Week would have been someone from Florida or LSU.
October 29: There was no Freak of the Week due to the game being at a neutral site with no exact team location. Instead, in the spirit of Halloween, Tebow and Spears "created" their own scariest player based on how good different players were from the SEC.

2017

October 28: There was no Freak of the Week due to the game being at a neutral site with no exact team location. Instead, in the spirit of Halloween, Tebow and Spears "created" their own scariest player based on how good different players were from the SEC.

2018

October 27: This week there were two throwback Freaks of the Week, for Georgia, Herschel Walker and for Florida, Jevon Kearse.

2019

References

 http://espnmediazone.com/us/press-releases/2014/05/sec-networks-sept-sites/

External links
 Official website

Southeastern Conference
Sports in the Southern United States
2014 American television series debuts
American sports television series
College football television series
ESPN original programming